Jeanne Nicholson (born September 22, 1943) was a Democratic member of the Colorado Senate, representing the 16th district from 2011 to 2015. Her district encompasses the city of Georgetown, Colorado.

Nicholson earned a master's degree from the University of Colorado in community health nursing. Her master's thesis was on "Politician's Perceptions of Public Health".

In the 2011 session of the Colorado General Assembly, Nicholson vice-chaired the local government committee and was a member of the appropriations, education and judiciary committees.

References

External links
 Jeanne Nicholson's official website

Democratic Party Colorado state senators
1952 births
Living people
University of Colorado alumni
People from Clear Creek County, Colorado
Women state legislators in Colorado
21st-century American politicians
21st-century American women politicians